This is a list of alumni of Keble College, Oxford. The school's alumni include politicians, lawyers, bishops, poets, and academics. The majority of this list are male; from its foundation in 1870 until 1979 Keble only admitted male students.

Academics
 Tim Besley, Professor of Economics at the London School of Economics
 Dame Averil Cameron, historian
 William Macbride Childs, the first vice-chancellor of the University of Reading
 O. G. S. Crawford, archaeologist
Martin Dixon, Professor of the Law of Real Property, University of Cambridge
 George Efstathiou, astrophysicist, Director of the Kavli Institute for Cosmology at the University of Cambridge
 Richard English, historian of Irish nationalism, terrorism expert and director of CSTPV at the University of St Andrews
 Austin Farrer, theologian and philosopher
 Nick Foskett, Vice-Chancellor of Keele University (from August 2010)
 William Hugh Clifford Frend, historian, archaeologist, priest
 Marc Goergen, professor of finance
 James Harris, FBA, Professor at the London School of Economics
 Christopher Hawkes, archaeologist
 Geoffrey Hill, poet
 Paul Johnson, government economist
 Roderick MacFarquhar, politician, journalist, academic
 Bryan Magee, philosopher
 James Martin, author
 Nicholas O'Shaughnessy, economist
 David Spiegelhalter, statistician
 Raymond Tallis, Professor of Geriatrics, University of Manchester
 Ralph Townsend, Headmaster of Winchester College
 Christopher Wickham, Chichele Professor of Medieval History in the University of Oxford, fellow of All Souls College, and winner of the 2005 Wolfson History Prize

Artists and broadcasters
 Thomas Armstrong, organist and conductor
 Leslie Banks, actor
 Frank Cottrell Boyce, children's author and screenwriter
 Katy Brand, actress, comedian and writer
 Ben Brown, television journalist
 Priyanga Burford, actor
 Humphrey Carpenter, writer and biographer
 Alexander Cockburn, journalist
 Giles Coren, writer
 Clement Crisp, dance critic
 Scott Ellaway, conductor and broadcaster
 Michael Elliot, theatre director
 Jeremy Filsell, piano and organ recitalist
 Michael Goodliffe, actor
 Tony Hall, Baron Hall of Birkenhead, journalist and administrator
 Ian Hamilton, poet and critic
 Paula Hawkins, novelist and journalist
 John Hayes, Director of the National Portrait Gallery (1974–1994)
 Charles Hazlewood, conductor and broadcaster
 Anthony Hedges, composer and lecturer
 Chris Hollins, sports journalist and TV presenter
 Robert Lloyd, singer
 David Owen Norris, pianist, composer and broadcaster
 Peter Pears, singer
 Gavin Plumley, cultural historian
 Jason Pontin, journalist, editor and publisher
 Max Rushden, presenter of Sky Sports' Soccer AM
 Angela Saini, writer
 Edward St Aubyn, author
 John Shaw, radio broadcaster
 Robert Steadman, composer
 Philip Stopford, composer and conductor
 Colin Touchin, conductor, composer, and music educator
 Hugh Welchman, filmmaker
 John Whitfield, conductor
 Andreas Whittam Smith, journalist
 Philip Wilby, composer
 Edward Windsor, Lord Downpatrick, fashion designer
 Andrew Hunter Murray, author and podcaster 
 Cressida Cowell, author

Business and leaders
 Peter Batey, Sino-British businessman
 Sally Bercow, wife of John Bercow — former Speaker of the House of Commons
 Mark Goldring, CEO of Oxfam
 Anne-Marie Imafidon, CEO of Stemettes

Clergy
 Walter Hubert Baddeley, bishop
 Ian James Brackley, bishop
 Harry James Carpenter, Bishop of Oxford
 Duleep De Chickera, Bishop of Colombo
 Stephen Conway, Bishop of Ely
 Lakdasa De Mel, Metropolitan Bishop of India, Pakistan, Burma and Ceylon
 Gregory Dix, historian, monk
 Cyril Garbett, Archbishop of York
 Frederick Joseph Kinsman, Bishop of Delaware
 John Richard Packer, Bishop of Ripon and Leeds
 Michael Francis Perham, Bishop of Gloucester
 Rev. David Railton, son of George Scott Railton and father of Dame Ruth Railton
 Geoffrey Rowell, Bishop of Gibraltar
 Harold Eustace Sexton, former Archbishop of British Columbia
 Marcus Stock, Bishop of Leeds
 David Thomas, Provincial Assistant Bishop of the Church in Wales
 John James Absalom Thomas, Bishop of Swansea and Brecon
 Michael Turnbull, bishop
 Chad Varah, Anglican priest, founder of the Samaritans
 Arthur Winnington-Ingram, Bishop of London

Lawyers
 Edwin Cameron, South African Rhodes scholar and current Constitutional Court of South Africa justice
 Dyson Heydon, former Justice of the High Court of Australia
 James Hunt, barrister and High Court judge
 Stewart Stevenson Moore, First Deemster and Clerk of the Rolls of the Isle of Man
 Randal Pinkett, participant on The Apprentice (US version) and President and CEO of BCT Partners
 Victor Priestwood, Crown Advocate of the British Supreme Court for China

Politicians
 Sir Arthur Dyke Acland, 13th Baronet, Liberal politician
 Andrew Adonis, Baron Adonis, politician
 Ed Balls, Labour politician, MP for Morley and Outwood 2010-2015, previous Shadow Chancellor of the Exchequer
 Robert Bourassa, Canadian politician
 William Burdett-Coutts, Conservative politician
 Reginald Craddock, politician
 William Davison, 1st Baron Broughshane
 Philip Dunne, politician
 Richard Harrington, Baron Harrington of Watford, Conservative politician
 Les Huckfield, politician
 Imran Khan, 22nd Prime Minister of Islamic Republic of Pakistan, Chairman Pakistan Tehreek-e-Insaf, Pakistani politician, former cricketer
 Peter Morrison, PPS to Margaret Thatcher
 Christopher Newbury, politician, member of the Council of Europe
 Tony Pua, Malaysian politician
 Sir Ivor Roberts, diplomat, President of Trinity College, Oxford
 George F. G. Stanley, Canadian historian, designer of Canadian flag, Lieutenant-Governor of New Brunswick
 Andy Street, Conservative Mayor of the West Midlands
 Sir James Cameron Tudor, Barbadian politician and diplomat
 Andrew Turner, politician
 Danny Williams, Premier of Newfoundland
 David Wilson, Baron Wilson of Tillyorn, diplomat and Sinologist

Sports people
 Ed Coode, British rower, twice World Champion and Olympic gold medallist
 Arthur James Dingle, English rugby union player
 Jason Flickinger, American rower and twice World Champion in the coxed fours
 Storm Uru, New Zealand rower, Olympic bronze medallist at the 2012 Summer Olympics, current MBA student

References

 
Keble College